This is a list of films which have placed number one at the weekly box office in the United Kingdom during 1992.

Number one films

Highest-grossing films
Highest-grossing films in the U.K. between 1 December 1991 and 29 November 1992

See also 
 List of British films — British films by year
 Lists of box office number-one films

References

1992
UK
Box office number-one films